Saint Bartholomew is a 1657 oil painting on canvas by Rembrandt. It is in the Timken Museum of Art in San Diego, California, U.S.

References

External links
 

1657 paintings
Paintings by Rembrandt
Paintings in the collection of the Timken Museum of Art
Paintings of people